Fitina Omborenga (born 20 May 1996) is a Rwandan professional footballer who plays as a right-back for APR Kigali.

Club career
On 31 August 2017, Omborenga returned to Rwanda from Topvar Topoľčany and signed a two-year contract with APR Kigali, a deal that would keep him at the military club until the end of the 2018–19 campaign.

In late January 2019 his former manager at APR, Ljupko Petrović, recommended him to the 31 times Bulgarian champion CSKA Sofia. In the beginning of February he was to sign a contract with CSKA and to be sent on loan to Litex Lovech until the end of the season. However, after Omborenga had trialled with CSKA, the move did not materialise.

International career
Scores and results list Rwanda's goal tally first, score column indicates score after each Omborenga goal.

References

External links
 
 Futbalnet profile

1996 births
Living people
People from Kigali
Rwandan footballers
Association football fullbacks
Rwanda international footballers
S.C. Kiyovu Sports players
MFK Topvar Topoľčany players
3. Liga (Slovakia) players
APR F.C. players
Rwandan expatriate footballers
Rwandan expatriate sportspeople in Slovakia
Expatriate footballers in Slovakia
2016 African Nations Championship players
Rwanda A' international footballers
2018 African Nations Championship players
2020 African Nations Championship players